The 2010–11 World Series of Poker Circuit was the 7th annual World Series of Poker Circuit.

Starting with the 2011 WSOP Circuit, the Circuit National Championship was held as a closed event for participants of various circuit events. The first Circuit National Championship was held at Caesars Palace in Las Vegas. The winner of this event received a World Series of Poker bracelet—the first ever to be awarded in an event other than the main Las Vegas World Series of Poker or the World Series of Poker Europe.

The first to get a WSOP bracelet by winning a WSOP Circuit National Championship was Sam Barnhart, who won the 100-qualifier event from May 27 - May 29, 2011.

Event schedule

WSOP Circuit National Championship
 3-Day Event: May 27 - May 29
 Number of Entries: 97  (100 qualified, but 3 failed to show)
 Total Prize Pool: $970,000
 Number of Payouts: 10
 Winning Hand:

Notes 

World Series of Poker Circuit
2011 in poker